The World Para Nordic Skiing Championships, known before 30 November 2016 as the IPC Biathlon and Cross-Country Skiing World Championships, along with the Winter Paralympic Games, are the most prestigious level of international competition in Paralympic nordic skiing.

On 30 November 2016, the International Paralympic Committee, which serves as the international federation for 10 disability sports, including Nordic skiing, adopted the "World Para" brand for all 10 sports. The world championship events in all of these sports were immediately rebranded as "World Para" championships.

Championships

See also
Biathlon at the Winter Paralympics
Cross-country skiing at the Winter Paralympics
Biathlon World Championships
FIS Nordic World Ski Championships

References

External links
World Para Nordic Skiing

 
Para
Para
Para
Paralympic biathlon
Nordic Skiing
Recurring sporting events established in 1974